Françoise Gaillard is a French literary critic, philosopher and professor at University of Paris VII specializing in fin-de-siècle French literature, aesthetics and art and is a regular visiting professor at New York University.

Background 

Françoise Gaillard is the author of various studies of French literature in its collective, political, and cultural framework. Gaillard is particularly interested in ideas of dogma and epistemology.

Gaillard has extensive proficiency in present-day artistic issues and is frequently a participant in debates and programs on French Culture. She has prepared a succession of debates on literature and philosophy at the Centre Georges Pompidou, collaborated for many years in the reviews La Quinzaine Littéraire and Canal (a magazine of contemporary art) and contributed to Le Monde des débats. She is a regular contributor to the seminars organized as Cerisy-la-Salle and serves on the editorial board of Romantisme, Etudes françaises, Esprit, Cahiers de médiologie, and Crises. She is a member of several research teams at the CNRS.

Publications
Diana Crash Éditions Descartes
La Modernité en questions Editions du Cerf
Littérature et médecine ou les pouvoirs du récit (co-auteur) Editions du Cerf
La Modernité en questions - De Richard Rorty à Jürgen Habermas (co-auteur) Editions du Cerf
Autoportrait sur fond de paysage americain MLN - Volume 119, Number 4, September 2004 (French Issue), pp. 637–643 The Johns Hopkins University Press

See also
 Literary criticism

References

Living people
Academic staff of the University of Paris
French art critics
French women academics
French women philosophers
Postmodernists
French art curators
French literary critics
Women literary critics
Continental philosophers
20th-century French philosophers
21st-century French philosophers
21st-century French writers
20th-century French women writers
21st-century French women writers
Year of birth missing (living people)